In mathematics, especially in order theory, a Galois connection is a particular correspondence (typically) between two partially ordered sets (posets).  Galois connections find applications in various mathematical theories. They generalize the fundamental theorem of Galois theory about the correspondence between subgroups and subfields, discovered by the French mathematician Évariste Galois.

A Galois connection can also be defined on preordered sets or classes; this article presents the common case of posets.
The literature contains two closely related notions of "Galois connection". In this article, we will refer to them as (monotone) Galois connections and antitone Galois connections.

A Galois connection is rather weak compared to an order isomorphism between the involved posets, but every Galois connection gives rise to an isomorphism of certain sub-posets, as will be explained below.
The term Galois correspondence is sometimes used to mean a bijective Galois connection; this is simply an order isomorphism (or dual order isomorphism, depending on whether we take monotone or antitone Galois connections).

Definitions

(Monotone) Galois connection 
Let  and  be two partially ordered sets.

 if and only if .

The term "adjoint" refers to the fact that monotone Galois connections are special cases of pairs of adjoint functors in category theory as discussed further below. Other terminology encountered here is left adjoint (resp. right adjoint) for the lower (resp. upper) adjoint.

An essential property of a Galois connection is that an upper/lower adjoint of a Galois connection uniquely determines the other:

Antitone Galois connection 
The above definition is common in many applications today, and prominent in lattice and domain theory. However the original notion in Galois theory is slightly different.

 if and only if .

Each polarity uniquely determines the other, since

All of the below statements on Galois connections can thus easily be converted into statements about antitone Galois connections.

Examples

Monotone Galois connections

Power set; implication and conjunction
A similar Galois connection whose lower adjoint is given by the meet (infimum) operation can be found in any Heyting algebra. In logical terms: "implication from " is the upper adjoint of "conjunction with ".

Lattices
Further interesting examples for Galois connections are described in the article on completeness properties. Roughly speaking, it turns out that the usual functions ∨ and ∧ are lower and upper adjoints to the diagonal map . The least and greatest elements of a partial order are given by lower and upper adjoints to the unique function  Going further, even complete lattices can be characterized by the existence of suitable adjoints. These considerations give some impression of the ubiquity of Galois connections in order theory.

Transitive group actions
Consider

the set of blocks containing .

Then, the correspondence :

is a monotone, one-to-one Galois connection. See Doubly transitive group for further discussion.

Image and inverse image
In the first Galois connection,  is the upper adjoint, while in the second Galois connection it serves as the lower adjoint.

Span and closure
Pick some mathematical object  that has an underlying set, for instance a group, ring, vector space, etc.

Syntax and semantics
A very general comment of William Lawvere is that syntax and semantics are adjoint: take  to be the set of all logical theories (axiomatizations), and  the power set of the set of all mathematical structures. For a theory , let  be the set of all structures that satisfy the axioms &hairsp;; for a set of mathematical structures , let  be the minimum of the axiomatizations which approximate  (in first-order logic, this is the set of sentences which are true in all structures in ). We can then say that  is a subset of  if and only if  logically implies : the "semantics functor"  and the "syntax functor"  form a monotone Galois connection, with semantics being the upper adjoint.

Antitone Galois connections

Galois theory
The motivating example comes from Galois theory: suppose  is a field extension. Let  be the set of all subfields of  that contain , ordered by inclusion ⊆. If  is  such a subfield, write  for the group of field automorphisms of  that hold  fixed. Then the maps  and  form an antitone Galois connection.

Algebraic topology: covering spaces

Linear algebra: annihilators and orthogonal complements

Algebraic geometry
In algebraic geometry, the relation between sets of polynomials and their zero sets is an antitone Galois connection.

Fix a natural number  and a field  and let  be the set of all subsets of the polynomial ring  ordered by inclusion ⊆, and let  be the set of all subsets of  ordered by inclusion ⊆. If  is a set of polynomials, define the variety of zeros as

Then  and I form an antitone Galois connection.

More generally, given a commutative ring  (not necessarily a polynomial ring), there is an antitone Galois connection between radical ideals in the ring and subvarieties of the affine variety .

More generally, there is an antitone Galois connection between ideals in the ring and subschemes of the corresponding affine variety.

Connections on power sets arising from binary relations

Up to isomorphism all antitone Galois connections between power sets arise in this way. This follows from the "Basic Theorem on Concept Lattices". Theory and applications of Galois connections arising from binary relations are studied in formal concept analysis. That field uses Galois connections for mathematical data analysis.  Many algorithms for Galois connections can be found in the respective literature, e.g., in.

Properties 
In the following, we consider a (monotone) Galois connection , where  is the lower adjoint as introduced above. Some helpful and instructive basic properties can be obtained immediately. These properties can be described by saying the composite  is deflationary, while  is inflationary (or extensive).

Now consider  such that . Then using the above one obtains . Applying the basic property of Galois connections, one can now conclude that . But this just shows that  preserves the order of any two elements, i.e. it is monotone. Thus monotonicity does not have to be included in the definition explicitly. However, mentioning monotonicity helps to avoid confusion about the two alternative notions of Galois connections.

Clearly we find that

.

because  is inflationary as shown above. On the other hand, since  is deflationary, while  is monotonic, one finds that

.

This shows the desired equality. Furthermore, we can use this property to conclude that

and

It can be shown (see Blyth or Erné for proofs) that a function  is a lower (resp. upper) adjoint if and only if  is a residuated mapping (resp. residual mapping). Therefore, the notion of residuated mapping and monotone Galois connection are essentially the same.

Closure operators and Galois connections 
The above findings can be summarized as follows: for a Galois connection, the composite  is monotone (being the composite of monotone functions), inflationary, and idempotent. Dually,  is monotone, deflationary, and idempotent. Such mappings are sometimes called kernel operators. Nuclei induce frame homomorphisms; a subset of a locale is called a sublocale if it is given by a nucleus.

In this way, closure operators and Galois connections are seen to be closely related, each specifying an instance of the other. Similar conclusions hold true for kernel operators.

Existence and uniqueness of Galois connections 
Another important property of Galois connections is that lower adjoints preserve all suprema that exist within their domain. Dually, upper adjoints preserve all existing infima. From these properties, one can also conclude monotonicity of the adjoints immediately. The adjoint functor theorem for order theory states that the converse implication is also valid in certain cases: especially, any mapping between complete lattices that preserves all suprema is the lower adjoint of a Galois connection.

In this situation, an important feature of Galois connections is that one adjoint uniquely determines the other. Hence one can strengthen the above statement to guarantee that any supremum-preserving map between complete lattices is the lower adjoint of a unique Galois connection. The existence of a certain Galois connection now implies the existence of the respective least or greatest elements, no matter whether the corresponding posets satisfy any completeness properties. Thus, when one upper adjoint of a Galois connection is given, the other upper adjoint can be defined via this same property.

Again, this can be dualized for the upper adjoint.

Galois connections as morphisms 
Galois connections also provide an interesting class of mappings between posets which can be used to obtain categories of posets. When considering categories of complete lattices, this can be simplified to considering just mappings preserving all suprema (or, alternatively, infima). Mapping complete lattices to their duals, these categories display auto duality, that are quite fundamental for obtaining other duality theorems. More special kinds of morphisms that induce adjoint mappings in the other direction are the morphisms usually considered for frames (or locales).

Connection to category theory 
Every partially ordered set can be viewed as a category in a natural way: there is a unique morphism from x to y if and only if . A monotone Galois connection is then nothing but a pair of adjoint functors between two categories that arise from partially ordered sets. In this context, the upper adjoint is the right adjoint while the lower adjoint is the left adjoint. However, this terminology is avoided for Galois connections, since there was a time when posets were transformed into categories in a dual fashion, i.e. with morphisms pointing in the opposite direction. This led to a complementary notation concerning left and right adjoints, which today is ambiguous.

Applications in the theory of programming 
Galois connections may be used to describe many forms of abstraction in the theory of abstract interpretation of programming languages.

Notes

References 
The following books and survey articles include Galois connections using the monotone definition:
 Brian A. Davey and Hilary A. Priestley: Introduction to Lattices and Order, Cambridge University Press, 2002.
 Gerhard Gierz, Karl H. Hofmann, Klaus Keimel, Jimmie D. Lawson, Michael W. Mislove, Dana S. Scott: Continuous Lattices and Domains, Cambridge University Press, 2003.
 Marcel Erné, Jürgen Koslowski, Austin Melton, George E. Strecker, A primer on Galois connections, in: Proceedings of the 1991 Summer Conference on General Topology and Applications in Honor of Mary Ellen Rudin and Her Work, Annals of the New York Academy of Sciences, Vol. 704, 1993, pp. 103–125. (Freely available online in various file formats PS.GZ PS, it presents many examples and results, as well as  notes on the different notations and definitions that arose in this area.)

Some publications using the original (antitone) definition:
 
 Thomas Scott Blyth, Lattices and Ordered Algebraic Structures, Springer, 2005, .
 Nikolaos Galatos, Peter Jipsen, Tomasz Kowalski, and Hiroakira Ono (2007), Residuated Lattices. An Algebraic Glimpse at Substructural Logics, Elsevier, .
 Garrett Birkhoff: Lattice Theory, Amer. Math. Soc. Coll. Pub., Vol 25, 1940
 

Galois theory
Order theory
Abstract interpretation
Closure operators